James Llewellyn Smith (May 22 1850 October 1, 1906) was a 19th-century American Boston maritime pilot. During his pilot service he served on the pilot boats Florence, Lillie, Hesper, and  Varuna,. Smith was one of the oldest Boston pilots and was in the Boston pilot service for 25 years. He died on March 3, 1818, in Provincetown, Massachusetts.

Early life

James L. Smith was born in Bremen, Maine on November 22, 1850. His parents were Captain James Smith (1818-1878) and Catherine Richards (1828-1856). Smith was married to Julia Kelly on April 21, 1873 and to his second wife, Annie Christina Nye on July 6, 1879. Smith and Annie had one child.

Career

Smith went to sea with his father when he was fourteen. His father was Master of the boat. They stayed at sea for a number of years before returning home.

In 1869, he was joined the Boston Pilots' Association and was assigned the pilot boat Florence, No. 6, which was built in 1867 by Dennison J. Lawlor. The vessel had a reputation for being fast under sail. 

By 1876, he was transferred to the pilot boat Lillie, No. 8, which was constructed by Pierce, Montgomery & Howard from a half-model made by naval architect Dennison J. Lawlor of Chelsea, Massachusetts. Smith was the boatkeeper on the Lillie for five years. In December 1880, Smith received his commission as a pilot on the Lillie.

Smith then moved to the pilot boat Hesper, No. 5, when she was built in October 1884. the Hesper was designed by Dennison J. Lawlor and built by the Howard & Montgomery shipyard in Chelsea. On January 2, 1897, Captain Smith was on the  Hesper when he brought in the Wilson Line steamer Chicago from Hull, England. He brought in the same ship, the same day the previous year in 1896. He stayed as a pilot on the Hesper until 1898.

On June 22, 1899, Smith escorted the  USS Massachusetts from the pilot boat  Varuna, No. 4. When he was to board the USS New York, he slipped and fell climbing the ladder to the ship. This accident confined him to his house for six weeks. The last boat he was attached to was the pilot boat Varuna. In December 1905, he retired from pilot service due to illness.

On April 17, 1904, Captain Smith was listed in the Boston Globe along with 34 Boston pilots that were in the Boston Pilots' Association.

Death

Captain Smith died, at age 55, at his home on October 1, 1906 in Arlington, Massachusetts. Funeral services were held at the Forest Hills' chapel at the Forest Hills Cemetery on October 4th. A large group of family, pilots and shipping men attended. 20 pilots followed the casket to the cemetery. Rev C. A. Littlefield officiated at the funeral. Pallbearers were from Smith's crew on the pilot boat Varuna, No. 4, which were Roswell Woodbury, Clifford McField, Thomas McLaughlin, and Harry Peterson. Those that attended were Boston pilot commissioner, Captain John C. Ross, Boston pilots, Captain William V. Abbott, Captain James Murdock, Captain Watson S. Dolliver, Captain Bruce McLean, Captain F. C. Lefray, and Captain George W. Lawlor.

See also
 List of Northeastern U. S. Pilot Boats

References

1850 births
1906 deaths
People from Arlington, Massachusetts
Sea captains
Maritime pilotage